Pierre-Louis Hus-Desforges (24 March 1773 – 20 January 1838) was a French cellist, conductor and composer. He is sometimes incorrectly referred to as "Pierre-Louis Hus-Desforges Jarnowick".

The grandson of theatre manager Barthélemy Hus-Desforges, he came from a long line of entertainers, the Hus family, and his grandmother was a Courtenay.

After he finished his studies at the Conservatoire de Paris with Benoit Tranquille Berbiguier, he began as a cellist in various orchestras. In the early nineteenth century, he was conductor at St. Petersburg, returned to Paris, then taught in Metz from 1819 to 1822.

Works 
 Concerto pour violoncelle
 Messe à trois voix et à grand orchestre
 Several Quintetto pour deux violons, alto, violoncelle et basse
 Several Sonatines brillantes et faciles pour violoncelle
 Sinfonie concertante pour violon et violoncelle obligés (c. 1797)
 L'Autel de sa patrie, melody by Citoyen Desforges (1798)
 Méthode de violoncelle à l'usage des commençants (1828)
 3 duos opus 31 for violin and cello

References

External links 
 Some works on Klassika 

French classical composers
French male classical composers
18th-century classical composers
19th-century classical composers
French male conductors (music)
French conductors (music)
19th-century conductors (music)
French music educators
French classical musicians
French classical cellists
Musicians from Toulon
1773 births
1838 deaths
19th-century French composers
18th-century French composers
18th-century French male musicians